Wayne Maris Hart (September 10, 1889 – April 1970) was an American football player, coach, and college athletics administrator.  He served as the head football coach at Clemson University for one season in 1916, compiling a record of 3–6. Hart was also Clemson's athletic director in 1916.  Born in Washington, D.C., he was an alumnus of Georgetown University and George Washington University.  He played football as a tackle at Georgetown from 1908 to 1911.  Hart was an assistant coach at Georgetown in 1912.  He coached at the McKinley Manual Training School in Washington in 1914 and 1915.  In 1915 he was named the head football coach at Gallaudet College—now known as Gallaudet University.

Head coaching record

College

References

1889 births
1970 deaths
American football tackles
Clemson Tigers athletic directors
Clemson Tigers football coaches
Gallaudet Bison football coaches
Georgetown Hoyas football coaches
Georgetown Hoyas football players
George Washington University alumni
High school football coaches in Washington, D.C.
Players of American football from Washington, D.C.